Jakub Tosik (born 21 May 1987) is a Polish professional footballer who plays as a defensive midfielder or a defender for ŁKS Łódź II.

Club career
He joined Polonia Warsaw after leaving GKS Bełchatów at the end of the 2009–10 season. On 13 July 2012, he signed a three-year contract with Ukrainian side FC Karpaty Lviv, after only a year Polonia Warsaw signed him back.

On 21 July 2020 he signed a two-year contract with ŁKS Łódź. On 4 August 2022, he penned a new two-year deal and was moved to the reserves team.

References

External links
 

1987 births
Living people
GKS Bełchatów players
Polonia Warsaw players
FC Karpaty Lviv players
Jagiellonia Białystok players
Zagłębie Lubin players
ŁKS Łódź players
Ekstraklasa players
Ukrainian Premier League players
I liga players
III liga players
Polish footballers
Polish expatriate footballers
Expatriate footballers in Ukraine
Polish expatriate sportspeople in Ukraine
Association football midfielders
People from Bełchatów County
Poland international footballers